Jonathan Hammond may refer to:

 Jonathan Hammond (filmmaker), American filmmaker
 Jonathan Hammond (footballer) (1891–1980), English footballer
 Jonathan Hammond (sport shooter) (born 1980), British sport shooter
 The namesake of the Jonathan Hammond House